Shri Agrasen Kanya P.G. College also known as Shri Agarsen Kanya Mahavidyalaya and as Shri Agrasen Kanya Post Graduate College is an autonomous women's college in Varanasi, Uttar Pradesh, India. Shri Agrasen Kanya P.G. College is affiliated to Mahatma Gandhi Kashi Vidyapith.

History
Shri Agrasen Kanya P.G. College was founded in 1973. The college is run by Shri Agrawal Samaj and situated in Bulanala, Varanasi. The college is affiliated to Mahatma Gandhi Kashi Vidyapith and got autonomy in the academic session 2001–02. The college is the first women's college in the state of Uttar Pradesh to attain "autonomous college" status. The college was accredited grade A by NAAC in 2005.

Courses
The college offers;

Undergraduate degrees (B.A, B.Com and B.Sc).
Post graduate degree (M.A).

See also

Mahatma Gandhi Kashi Vidyapith
List of educational institutions in Varanasi

References

Colleges in India
Women's universities and colleges in Uttar Pradesh
Universities and colleges in Varanasi
Memorials to Agrasen
Mahatma Gandhi Kashi Vidyapith
Educational institutions established in 1973
1973 establishments in Uttar Pradesh